Givenchy may refer to:

 Givenchy, a French brand of clothing, accessories, perfumes and cosmetics with Parfums Givenchy. Founded by Hubert de Givenchy (1927-2018)

Places
Givenchy is part of the name of several communes in the Pas-de-Calais département of northern France:
 Givenchy-en-Gohelle, which is the location of the Canadian National Vimy Memorial
 Givenchy-le-Noble
 Givenchy-lès-la-Bassée

Others
 Battle of Givenchy (December 18-December 22, 1914)
 HMCS Givenchy
 Givenchy